Jiří Kochta (born October 11, 1946 in Prague, Czechoslovakia) is a retired professional ice hockey player who played in the Czechoslovak Extraliga.  He played for HC Jihlava and HC Sparta Praha.  He won a bronze medal at the 1972 Winter Olympics.

External links 

1946 births
HC Dukla Jihlava players
HC Sparta Praha players
Ice hockey players at the 1968 Winter Olympics
Ice hockey players at the 1972 Winter Olympics
Living people
Medalists at the 1972 Winter Olympics
Medalists at the 1968 Winter Olympics
Olympic bronze medalists for Czechoslovakia
Olympic ice hockey players of Czechoslovakia
Olympic medalists in ice hockey
Olympic silver medalists for Czechoslovakia
Ice hockey people from Prague
Czechoslovak expatriate sportspeople in West Germany
Czechoslovak expatriate sportspeople in Italy
Czechoslovak expatriate sportspeople in Germany
Czech expatriate sportspeople in Switzerland
Czech expatriate sportspeople in Germany
Czechoslovak ice hockey right wingers
Czech ice hockey right wingers
Czechoslovak ice hockey coaches
Czech expatriate ice hockey people
Czechoslovak expatriate ice hockey people
Czech ice hockey coaches
Expatriate ice hockey players in West Germany